The Biologics Control Act of 1902, also known as the Virus-Toxin Law, was the first law that implemented federal regulations of biological products such as vaccines in the United States. It was enacted in response to two incidents involving the deaths of 22 children who had contracted tetanus from contaminated vaccines. This law paved the way for further regulation of drug products under the Pure Food and Drug Act of 1906 and the Federal Food, Drug, and Cosmetic Act of 1938. Biologics control is now under the supervision of the U.S. Food and Drug Administration (FDA).

History

When the large scale production of vaccines and anti-toxin serum began in the late 19th century, the United States had no government regulations on biological products. In 1901, a 5-year-old girl died of tetanus in St. Louis, Missouri, after being given a diphtheria anti-toxin. Investigations found that the St. Louis Board of Health produced the contaminated anti-toxin using the blood of a horse infected with tetanus. While the infected horse, Jim, was killed, the Board of Health continued to use the serum to treat diphtheria. It was later discovered that 12 other children had died from the same contaminated anti-toxin serum in St. Louis. That same year, nine children in Camden, New Jersey, died from contaminated smallpox vaccines. These incidents led the Hygienic Laboratory and the Medical Society of the District of Columbia to propose a law regulating the production of biological products. On July 1, 1902, Congress passed the Biologics Control Act.

Contents of the Act 
The Biologics Control Act established a board to oversee the implementation of regulations of biological products. The board consisted of the Surgeon-General of the Army, the Surgeon-General of the Navy, and the Surgeon-General of the Marine Hospital Service, and was to be overseen by the Secretary of the Treasury. This board was given the power to issue, suspend, and revoke licenses to produce and sell biological products. The Biologics Control Act also mandated that all products be labeled accurately with the name of the product and the address and license number of the manufacturer. Laboratories could be subjected to unannounced inspections by the Treasury Department. The punishment for the violation of this law was a fine of up to $500 or up to a year in prison.

Institutions 
The Laboratory of Hygiene of the Marine Hospital Service, established on Staten Island, NY, in 1887, was in charge of testing biologics before the Biologics Control Act. It was moved to Washington, D.C., in 1891, and renamed the Hygienic Laboratory of the Public Health and Marine Hospital Service in 1902. The Hygienic Laboratory was responsible for renewing licenses annually, testing products, and performing inspections. In 1930, the Ransdell Act transformed the Hygienic Laboratory into the National Institute of Health and gave it a larger role in public health research. In 1948, the name was changed again to the National Institutes of Health, as it encompassed many institutes and centers dedicated to biomedical research. In 1972, biologics regulation was moved to the Food and Drug Administration and later became known as the Center for Biologics Evaluation and Research (CBER).

Impact 
The Biologics Control Act set a precedent for the federal regulation of biologics such as vaccines and blood components. With the development of biotechnology, the FDA's Center for Biologics Evaluation and Research (CBER) has taken a larger role in reviewing and approving new biological products intended for medical purposes, including probiotics, xenotransplantation and gene therapy.

References

57th United States Congress
Vaccination law
United States federal health legislation
1902 in American law
Drug safety
Biotechnology law
Vaccination in the United States